Dichocrocis definita is a moth in the family Crambidae. It was described by Arthur Gardiner Butler in 1889. It is found in India (Assam).

References

Moths described in 1889
Spilomelinae